The men's competition in the heavyweight (– 105 kg) division was held on 25 and 26 September 2010.

Schedule

Medalists

Records

Results

References
Page 37 

- Mens 105 kg, 2010 World Weightlifting Championships